K. M. Krishnamurthy was an Indian politician from the state of Karnataka. He was a leader of the Indian National Congress. He was elected as an MLA from Kadur assembly constituency for four consecutive terms.

References 

People from Karnataka
Indian National Congress politicians
People from Chikkamagaluru district
Indian politicians
Karnataka MLAs 1994–1999
Karnataka MLAs 1999–2004
Karnataka MLAs 2004–2007
1949 births
2010 deaths